Stéphane Ganeff (born 18 January 1959) is a Belgian fencer. He competed for Belgium at the 1980 and 1984 Summer Olympics and for the Netherlands at the 1988 Summer Olympics.

References

External links
 

1959 births
Living people
Dutch male foil fencers
Dutch male épée fencers
Belgian male épée fencers
Belgian male foil fencers
Olympic fencers of Belgium
Olympic fencers of the Netherlands
Fencers at the 1980 Summer Olympics
Fencers at the 1984 Summer Olympics
Fencers at the 1988 Summer Olympics
Sportspeople from The Hague